Beautiful Loser is the eighth studio album by American rock artist Bob Seger, released in 1975. This album marked Seger's return to Capitol Records after a four-year split. His previous record with Capitol was Brand New Morning in 1971.

The album relied mostly on session musicians from the Muscle Shoals Rhythm Section, but the Silver Bullet Band members were used separately on some songs and together on "Nutbush City Limits," a cover song of the hit by Ike & Tina Turner.

Track listing

Note
The liner notes credit "Nutbush City Limits" to the Silver Bullet Band, while the album as a whole is credited to only Bob Seger.

Personnel 

Track numbering refers to CD and digital releases of the album.

 Bob Seger - lead vocals (all tracks), guitar (tracks 4, 5, 9), slide guitar (track 3), harmonica (track 3), piano (track 4)

Muscle Shoals Rhythm Section (all tracks except tracks 4 and 7)
 Barry Beckett - grand piano, organ, synthesizer, electric piano
 Pete Carr - lead guitar, acoustic guitar
 Roger Hawkins - drums, percussion
 David Hood - bass guitar
 Jimmy Johnson - rhythm guitar
 Spooner Oldham - organ, electric piano

Muscle Shoals Horn Section (track 3)
 Harrison Calloway - trumpet
 Ron Eades - baritone saxophone
 Charles Rose - trombone
 Harvey Thompson - tenor saxophone

Silver Bullet Band (track 7)
 Drew Abbott - guitar
 Chris Campbell - bass guitar
 Charlie Martin - drums
 Robyn Robbins - organ

Additional musicians
 Drew Abbott - guitar (tracks 2, 3)
 Kenny Bell - guitar (track 3)
 Pete Carr - guitar solo (track 6)
 Tom Cartmell - saxophone (track 7)
 Paul Kingery - guitar solo (track 7)
 Robyn Robbins - Mellotron (track 4)
 Stoney & Rocky - background vocals (track 3)

Production
 Punch Andrews - production (tracks 4 and 7 only), mixing
 Jim Bruzzesse - engineering
 Jerry Masters - engineering
 Steve Melton - engineering
 Muscle Shoals Rhythm Section - production (all tracks except 4 and 7)
 Bob Seger - production (all tracks), mixing
 Greg Smith - engineering

Charts
Album - Billboard (United States)

Singles - Billboard (United States)

References

Bob Seger albums
1975 albums
Albums produced by Barry Beckett
Albums recorded at Muscle Shoals Sound Studio
Capitol Records albums